Edge Spectrum Inc (ESI), formerly known as Vertical Spectrum, is a TV broadcasting company founded in 2016 and based in Snoqualmie, Washington. ESI owns and operates low-power television stations and sees itself as well-positioned for the new ATSC 3.0 broadcasting standards.

In 2017, ESI purchased 60 operating low-power stations, and 10 low-power construction permits from religious broadcaster 3ABN.

ESI grew exponentially in 2017 when they agreed to purchase the religious broadcaster International Broadcast Network (IBN)'s low-power television network in a $72 million deal covering 196 stations and construction permits. The stations were purchased from various subsidiaries of EICB TV LLC and to Grace Worship Center Inc.

References

External links
http://www.edgespectrum.com/

 
2016 establishments in Washington (state)
Television broadcasting companies of the United States